Akeley Holmes (January 27, 1894 – November 10, 1946) was a Canadian politician. He served in the Legislative Assembly of New Brunswick as member of the Conservative party representing Northumberland County from 1925 to 1930.

References

20th-century Canadian politicians
1897 births
1946 deaths
Progressive Conservative Party of New Brunswick MLAs